The goblet cell carcinoid (GCC) is a rare biphasic gastrointestinal tract tumour that consists of a neuroendocrine component and a conventional carcinoma, histologically arising from Paneth cells.

Sign and symptoms
GCCs may present as appendicitis.

Diagnosis

GCCs are diagnosed by pathology.  They have a characteristic biphasic appearance which includes (1) goblet cell-like cells, and (2) neuroendocrine-type nuclear chromatin (stippled chromatin).

Prognosis
GCCs have an aggressive course compared to other appendiceal neuroendocrine tumours.

Treatment
GCCs are treated with surgery.

See also
Neuroendocrine tumours

References

External links 

Gastrointestinal cancer